Mallotus may refer to:
 Mallotus (fish), a fish genus in the family Osmeridae
 Mallotus (plant), a plant genus in the family Euphorbiaceae